Ronald A. Guzman (born November 18, 1948) is a senior United States district judge of the United States District Court for the Northern District of Illinois.

Education and career

Born in Rio Piedras, Puerto Rico, Guzman received a Bachelor of Arts degree from Lehigh University in 1970 and a Juris Doctor from New York University Law School in 1973. He was in private practice from 1973 to 1974, and was an assistant states attorney of Cook County, Illinois from 1975 to 1980. He was a staff attorney (part-time), for the Association House of Chicago from 1980 to 1984, returning to private practice in Chicago, Illinois from 1980 to 1990. He served as a United States magistrate judge for the United States District Court for the Northern District of Illinois from 1990 to 1999.

Federal judicial service

On August 5, 1999, Guzman was nominated by President Bill Clinton to a seat on the United States District Court for the Northern District of Illinois vacated by Brian Barnett Duff. Guzman was confirmed by the United States Senate on November 10, 1999, and received his commission on November 15, 1999. He assumed senior status on November 16, 2014.

See also
List of Hispanic/Latino American jurists

Sources

1948 births
Living people
Lehigh University alumni
New York University School of Law alumni
Hispanic and Latino American judges
Judges of the United States District Court for the Northern District of Illinois
People from Río Piedras, Puerto Rico
United States district court judges appointed by Bill Clinton
United States magistrate judges
20th-century American judges
21st-century American judges